Kuala Kedah may refer to:
Kuala Kedah
Kuala Kedah (federal constituency), represented in the Dewan Rakyat